Luntz is a German or Yiddish surname, a variant of Lunz. Notable people with the surname include:

Édouard Luntz (1931–2009), French film director
Frank Luntz (born 1962), American political consultant and pollster
Harold Luntz (born 1937), Australian law professor

See also
 Lunz (disambiguation)
Lunts